The McFaddin–Ward House is a historic home in Beaumont, Texas, United States built in 1905 1906 in the Beaux-Arts Colonial Revival style.  The  house and furnishings reflect the lifestyle of the prominent family who lived in the house for seventy-five years. The house was added to the National Register of Historic Places in 1971.

Di Vernon Averill commissioned architect Henry Conrad Mauer to build the house, which was sold the next year to Di's brother, William P.H. McFaddin. McFaddin and his wife Ida Caldwell McFaddin, from Huntington, West Virginia, moved into the house in 1907 with their three children: Mamie, age 11, Perry Jr., age 9, and James Caldwell, age 6.

A substantial carriage house was added in the same year. The carriage house had a stable, hayloft, garage, gymnasium and servant's quarters.  When the McFaddins' daughter Mamie married Carroll Ward in 1919, the newlyweds moved in with the McFaddins and lived their entire married lives there.

Before Mamie McFaddin Ward died in 1982, she created a foundation to preserve the house as a museum which opened to the public in 1986. Guests ages 8 and older are welcome for tours of the home led by volunteer docents Tuesday through Saturday. The museum strongly encourages reservations as tours run approximately one to one and a half hours long. Self-guided tours of the first floor are available on Sundays. The carriage house and grounds are open to all ages during museum hours. Outside the three-floor home are spacious lawns, flower beds and rose gardens. Inside, a substantial permanent collection of antique furniture and household items are in view. The McFaddin–Ward House is one of the few house museums in which the home's original furnishings are intact and on display. It is also one of the few Beaux-Arts Colonial homes still open to the public.

Educational programs focus on history and are geared toward children and adults. The museum hosts lectures, special celebrations, summer camps, and open houses. New exhibits and displays are changed often, giving fresh interpretations of the home. Christmas time is especially celebrated with special events and an open house when the public is invited to enjoy eggnog and McFaddin family recipes before touring the first floor of the house.

In addition, it was named a Texas State Historic Landmark in 1976. The home has been featured  various TV's Arts & Entertainment's America's Castles as a Lone Star Estate (only 3 Texas homes were featured), and the house has been included in several important architectural books.

See also

National Register of Historic Places listings in Jefferson County, Texas
Recorded Texas Historic Landmarks in Jefferson County

References

External links

Buildings and structures in Beaumont, Texas
Houses on the National Register of Historic Places in Texas
Historic house museums in Texas
Museums in Beaumont, Texas
Houses completed in 1906
Houses in Jefferson County, Texas
National Register of Historic Places in Jefferson County, Texas
Recorded Texas Historic Landmarks
1906 establishments in Texas